Al Russas (August 22, 1923 – February 14, 1995) was an American football tackle and defensive end. He played for the Detroit Lions in 1949.

References

1923 births
1995 deaths
American football tackles
American football defensive ends
Tennessee Volunteers football players
Detroit Lions players